Don Hollingsworth (born c. 1932) was a Canadian football player who played for the BC Lions and Ottawa Rough Riders. He played junior football for the Ottawa Sooners.

References

1930s births
BC Lions players
Ottawa Rough Riders players
Canadian football running backs
Living people